San Miniato Basso is a village in Tuscany, central Italy, administratively a frazione of the comune of San Miniato, province of Pisa.

San Miniato Basso is about 45 km from Pisa and 2 km from San Miniato.

References

Bibliography 
 

Frazioni of the Province of Pisa
Railway towns in Italy